Kathleen McCartney (born 1956) is an American academic administrator, currently serving as the 11th president of Smith College. She took office as Smith's president on October 19, 2013. Smith College, located in Northampton, Massachusetts, is a liberal arts college and one of the Seven Sisters colleges.

Early life and education

McCartney was born in Medford, Massachusetts. The first in her family to attend college, she graduated summa cum laude from Tufts University and earned her master's and doctoral degrees in psychology from Yale University.

Career 
McCartney came to Smith from the Harvard Graduate School of Education, where she was dean, and the Gerald S. Lesser Professor in Early Childhood Development. During her tenure at Harvard, the school introduced a three-year doctorate in educational leadership in collaboration with the Harvard Business School and Kennedy School of Government. Prior teaching and research experience includes service as a tenured associate professor of psychology and family studies as well as director of the Child Study and Development Center at the University of New Hampshire.

Since assuming the Smith presidency, McCartney has launched initiatives on college access and affordability, design thinking, and the liberal arts, women in STEM and the capacities women need to succeed and lead. Under her leadership, Smith has engaged architectural designer Maya Lin to re-imagine its historic Neilson Library as an intellectual commons at the heart of the college campus. The expected completion date for the project is fall 2020.

Research and academic interests
McCartney's research has focused on early experience and development, particularly with respect to child care, early childhood education, and poverty. She has published more than 150 articles and book chapters on those topics and was the principal researcher for Child Care and Child Development, a 20-year study published in 2005 that examined whether early and extensive child care disrupted the mother-child relationship. She co-edited Experience and Development, The Blackwell Handbook of Early Childhood Development, and Best Practices in Developmental Research Methods. In 1983, McCartney and Sandra Scarr published a developmental theory of gene-environment correlation.

McCartney has written extensively on issues of gender, education and parenting, including essays and letters in The New York Times, The Wall Street Journal, Worth, CNN, The Boston Globe, and HuffPost.

McCartney is a fellow of the American Academy of Arts and Sciences, the American Educational Research Association, the American Psychological Association, and the American Psychological Society.

Awards and honors
A developmental psychologist, McCartney was the recipient in 2009 of the Distinguished Contribution Award from the Society for Research in Child Development. In 2011 The Boston Globe named her one of the 30 most innovative people in Massachusetts. In 2013, she received the Harvard College Women's Professional Achievement Award, which honors an individual who has demonstrated exceptional leadership in her professional field. In March 2015, she was elected to the board of directors of the American Council on Education (ACE). The Boston Business Journal named her one of its 2016 Women of Influence, citing her extensive work on early childhood education.

References

External links
 Smith College biography
 Office of the President Kathleen McCartney files at Smith College Archives, Smith College Special Collections

21st-century American psychologists
American women psychologists
Fellows of the American Academy of Arts and Sciences
Harvard Graduate School of Education faculty
University of New Hampshire faculty
Tufts University alumni
Yale University alumni
1956 births
Living people
People from Medford, Massachusetts
Presidents of Smith College
Women heads of universities and colleges
American women academics
21st-century American women
20th-century American psychologists